Next may refer to:

Arts and entertainment

Film
 Next (1990 film), an animated short about William Shakespeare
 Next (2007 film), a sci-fi film starring Nicolas Cage
 Next: A Primer on Urban Painting, a 2005 documentary film

Literature
 Next (Crichton novel), a novel by Michael Crichton
 Next (Hynes novel), a 2010 novel by James Hynes
 Next (play), a play by Terrence McNally
 Next: The Future Just Happened, a 2001 non-fiction book by Michael Lewis

Music

Performers
 Next (American band), an R&B trio
 NEXT (Korean band), a South Korean rock band
 Next (Chinese group), a boy group

Albums
 Next (ATB album), 2017
 Next (Journey album) or the title song, 1977
 Next (The Necks album) or the title instrumental, 1990
 Next (The Sensational Alex Harvey Band album) or the title song (see below), 1973
 Next (Sevendust album), 2005
 Next (Soulive album), 2002
 Next (Vanessa Williams album), 1997
 Next! or the title song, by Seeed, 2005
 Next, by 7th Heaven, 2015

Songs
 "Next" (Sevyn Streeter song), 2017
 "Next" (Ivy Queen song), 2020
 "Next", by Béla Fleck and the Flecktones from Little Worlds
 "Next", by the Justified Ancients of Mu Mu from 1987 (What the Fuck Is Going On?)
 "Next", by Lil Pump
 "Next", by Raven-Symoné from Raven-Symoné
 "Next", by Ufo361
 "Next", by The Weeknd from Echoes of Silence
 "Au suivant", by Jacques Brel from Les Bonbons, 1966; recorded in an English-language version as "Next" by Scott Walker and the Sensational Alex Harvey Band

Television
 Next! (TV series), a 2002 American sketch comedy series
 Next (2005 TV series), a dating show on MTV
 Next (2020 TV series), a drama series on Fox
 "Next" (Desperate Housewives), an episode
 The Next: Fame Is at Your Doorstep, a 2012 American reality series

Other media
 Next (Nigeria), a newspaper
 Next Magazine (Santa Monica), a music industry trade publication
 Next, a regional radio news show produced by the New England News Collaborative and WNPR
 "Next", a 2018 update for the video game No Man's Sky

Brands and enterprises
 Next (bicycle company)
 Next (cigarettes)
 Next (Indian retailer)
 Next (restaurant)
 NeXT, a 1980s computer company later bought by Apple Computer
 Next Management, a modeling agency
 Next Media, a publishing company in Hong Kong, China
 Next plc, a British clothing retailer

Education
 National Exit Test, an exit exam for MBBS students in India

Science and technology
 NEXT (ion thruster), an ion thruster developed at NASA Glenn Research Center
 NExT, a mission of the Stardust space probe
 New X-ray Telescope or NeXT, a Japanese hard X-ray observatory
 Project NExT, a professional development program for mathematicians
 Yahoo! Next, a former showcase for Yahoo! projects
 Next.js, a web development framework

Transport
 Project NEXT, a proposed public transport payment system for New Zealand
 Stadler NExT, a Swiss commuter train

See also

 NXT (disambiguation)
 NEX (disambiguation)